The Under Armour Undeniable Performance ESPY Award was only awarded once, in 2006, on the player, irrespective of gender or nationality, adjudged to have made, in a given calendar year, the most significant, remarkable, and undeniable performance in a single regular season or playoff game contested professionally under the auspices of one of the four major North American leagues or collegiately under the auspices of the National Collegiate Athletic Association.  The award was one of two corporate-sponsored ESPYs; the titular sponsor designates criteria for selection consistent with its advertising campaigns.     

Balloting for the award was conducted over the Internet by fans from amongst between three and five choices selected by the ESPN Select Nominating Committee.  At the time, the ESPY Awards ceremony was conducted in June (it is now held in July) and awards conferred reflect performance and achievement over the twelve months preceding presentation.

List of winners

See also
Best Moment ESPY Award
Best Play ESPY Award
Best Record-Breaking Performance ESPY Award
GMC Professional Grade Play ESPY Award

External links
Enumeration of past winners from HickokSports.com

ESPY Awards